The Church of Our Lady Star of the Sea is a Roman Catholic parish church in the Roman Catholic Archdiocese of New York, located at 5371 Amboy Road, Staten Island, New York City. It was established in 1935 as a former mission of Our Lady Help of Christians.

References 

Christian organizations established in 1935
Roman Catholic churches in Staten Island